Geoffrey Lawton Courtnall (born August 18, 1962) is a Canadian former professional ice hockey player who played in the National Hockey League (NHL) from 1983 to 2000. He was the head coach of the Victoria Grizzlies of the British Columbia Hockey League (BCHL) and for the Victoria Vikes of the British Columbia Intercollegiate Hockey League (BCIHL).

Playing career
Geoff Courtnall was signed by the Boston Bruins of the NHL as an undrafted free agent on July 6, 1983. He played for the Bruins from the 1983–84 season to March 8, 1988, when he was traded, along with Bill Ranford, to the Edmonton Oilers for Andy Moog. While in Edmonton, he helped the Oilers win the Stanley Cup in 1988, after facing his old team the Bruins in the finals. About four months later, the Oilers traded Courtnall to the Washington Capitals for Greg Adams. After two seasons in Washington, according to the biography on his 1990 Pro-Set Hockey card, Courtnall requested a trade. Courtnall was traded during the off-season to the St. Louis Blues for Mike Lalor and Peter Zezel.

Courtnall's first nine seasons were spent on five NHL and two AHL clubs, the Hershey Bears and Moncton Golden Flames.

After less than a season in St. Louis and at the trade deadline, Courtnall, along with Robert Dirk, Sergio Momesso, Cliff Ronning, and future considerations, was traded to the Vancouver Canucks in exchange for Garth Butcher and Dan Quinn. This trade marked a major turning point for the Canucks as these players were among the core that would lead the Canucks on their run to the 1994 Stanley Cup Finals. Courtnall then played one more season in Vancouver after the Cup run of 1994 and went back to the St. Louis for the start of the 1995–96 season. Courtnall, in his second tenure with the Blues, scored almost 80 goals over five seasons, but only played 30 games over his final two seasons as the result of several concussions, but reached the 1,000 game mark during the 1997–98 season, in which he scored 31 goals in his last full season. After sitting out the last half of the 1998–99 season with a concussion he returned to the lineup the next season. A few games into the 1999–2000 season, he suffered another concussion, which forced his retirement as a result of post-concussion syndrome.

Personal life
Courtnall was born in Victoria, British Columbia, Canada and raised in Duncan, British Columbia. He is the brother of another former NHL player, Russ Courtnall. Geoff's son, Justin, was drafted 210th overall in the 2007 NHL Entry Draft by the Tampa Bay Lightning.

Controversy
In May 1990, while playing for the Capitals, Courtnall was accused of raping a 17-year-old woman outside a bar, alongside teammates Dino Ciccarelli, Scott Stevens, and Neil Sheehy. The court case fell apart, though a spokesperson for the Metropolitan police at the time stated that the police “have sufficient grounds to believe that a criminal offense did occur.”

Awards and achievements
 Stanley Cup champion – 1988

Career statistics

International

See also
 List of family relations in the NHL
 List of NHL players with 1,000 games played

References

External links
 

1962 births
Living people
Boston Bruins players
Cowichan Valley Capitals players
Edmonton Oilers players
Hershey Bears players
Ice hockey people from British Columbia
Moncton Golden Flames players
People from Duncan, British Columbia
Sportspeople from Victoria, British Columbia
St. Louis Blues players
Stanley Cup champions
Undrafted National Hockey League players
Vancouver Canucks players
Victoria Cougars (WHL) players
Washington Capitals players
Canadian ice hockey left wingers